Akousa… (Greek: Άκουσα…; English: I Heard...) is the second studio album by popular Greek singer Nikos Oikonomopoulos. It was released on 18 December 2008 by Sony BMG Greece. The song "Etsi Nomizeis (Kai Mi Giriseis)" was the most popular.

Track listing
"Heimoniase" (Χειμώνιασε; Winter Comes) - 4:27	
"Tha Sto Kratao" (Θα Στο Κρατάω; Will I Keep) - 3:28	
"Adiorthoti" (Αδιόρθωτη; Unadjusted) - 3:52	
"Eho Na Matho" (Έχω Να Μάθω; I To Know) - 3:28	
"Ftaio" (Φταίω; Be At Fault) - 2:51	
"Akousa…" (Άκουσα…; I Heard…) - 3:27	
"Epanasindesi" (Επανασύνδεση; Reconnect) - 3:46	
"Ti Na 'Rtho Na Kano" (Τι Να 'Ρθω Να Κάνω; What Come How To Come To Do) - 4:02
"Mes Stin Diki Sou Filaki" (Μες Στην Δική Σου Φυλακή; In Your Own Prison)	 - 3:48
"Den Eho Thesi Sta Oneira Sou" (Δεν Έχω Θέση Στα Όνειρα Σου; There I Place In Your Dreams) - 3:26	
"Harakia" (Χαρακιά; Snick)	 - 4:07
"Kommatia Ta Filia" (Κομμάτια Τα Φιλιά; Pieces The Kisses) - 3:43	
"Pistevo" (Πιστεύω; Believe) - 4:07	
"Eisai Oles Ekeines Mazi" (Είσαι Όλες Εκείνες Μαζί; Are All Those Together) - 3:06
"Etsi Nomizeis (Kai Mi Giriseis)" (Έτσι Νομίζεις (Και Μη Γυρίσεις); You Think So (And Do Not Come Back) - 4:06

Chart performance 

The album went gold several months after release.

References

2008 albums
Nikos Oikonomopoulos albums
Greek-language albums
Sony Music Greece albums